Petra Halmai (born 29 May 1997) is a Hungarian swimmer. She competed in the women's 100 metre breaststroke event at the 2020 European Aquatics Championships, in Budapest, Hungary.

References

External links
 

1997 births
Living people
People from Dombóvár
Hungarian female breaststroke swimmers
Swimmers at the 2020 Summer Olympics
Olympic swimmers of Hungary
Sportspeople from Tolna County
20th-century Hungarian women
21st-century Hungarian women
Florida Gulf Coast Eagles women's swimmers